James Robert Ewan McLeary (born 2 April 1981) is a Scottish professional golfer who plays on the Challenge Tour.

Career
McLeary was born in Peterhead, Scotland. In 2004 he represented Scotland at the Eisenhower Trophy and represented Great Britain and Ireland at the St Andrews Trophy. His team won the St Andrews Trophy and McLeary won the individual event as well. He played college golf at Odessa College and Baylor University in the United States.

McLeary reached the final stages of qualifying for the Asian Tour in both 2005 and 2006, but failed to win full playing privileges and played some events with only a partial category. He has played on the second tier European Challenge Tour since 2006, having failed to win a place on the European Tour in his several visits to qualifying school. His best finish on the end of season Challenge Tour Rankings came in 2009 when he placed 24th, missing out on the top 20 needed to achieve full European Tour status. In August 2009 he picked up his first professional win at the Scottish Hydro Challenge.

McLeary lives in Bonnyrigg, Midlothian.

Amateur wins
2001 Scottish Youths Amateur Championship
2004 St Andrews Links Trophy

Professional wins (3)

Challenge Tour wins (2)

Tartan Pro Tour wins (1)

Team appearances
Amateur
European Youths' Team Championship (representing Scotland): 2002
Eisenhower Trophy (representing Scotland): 2004
St Andrews Trophy (representing Great Britain and Ireland): 2004 (winners)

Photo gallery

See also
2013 Challenge Tour graduates
2015 Challenge Tour graduates

References

External links

Baylor Bears profile

Scottish male golfers
European Tour golfers
Asian Tour golfers
Baylor Bears men's golfers
Sportspeople from Aberdeenshire
Golfers from Edinburgh
People from Peterhead
1981 births
Living people